The Voivodeship of Serbia and Banat of Temeschwar or Serbian Voivodeship and the Banate of Temes, known simply as the Serbian Voivodeship, was a crownland of the Austrian Empire that existed between 1849 and 1860.

It was a separate crownland named after two former provinces: Serbian Vojvodina and Banat of Temeswar. Its former area is now divided between Serbia, Romania and Hungary. The Voivodeship gave its name to the present Serbian Vojvodina.

Names
In contemporary Serbian it was known as Vojvodina Srbska i Tamiški Banat (Войводина Србска и Тамишки Банат) and Vojvodstvo Srbija i Tamiški Banat (Војводство Србија и Тамишки Банат).

In various sources (both, Serbian and German) there are two somewhat different variants of the name of the voivodeship, one could be translated into English as Voivodeship of Serbia and Temes Banat and another as Serbian Voivodeship and Temes Banat.

Also in modern English use, the term Temes Banat or Banat of Temes is sometimes incorrectly replaced with term Banat of Temeschwar or Temeschwar Banat. In the original name in all native languages, there is no mention of the city of Temeschwar (Timișoara) in the title of Voivodeship. As shown above, the reference to the Temes region is always used, and should be translated into English as Temes Banat or Banat of Temes.

History

The Voivodeship was formed by a decision of the Austrian emperor in November 1849, after the Revolutions of 1848/1849. It was formed in accordance with privilege given to Serbs by the Habsburg emperor in 1691, recognizing the right of Serbs to territorial autonomy within the Habsburg monarchy.

It consisted of the regions of Banat, Bačka and northern Syrmian municipalities of Ilok and Ruma. An Austrian governor seated in Temeschwar ruled the area, and the title of Voivode belonged to the emperor himself. The full title of the emperor was "Grand Voivod of the Voivodeship of Serbia". Even after the Voivodeship was abolished, the emperor kept this title until the end of Austro-Hungarian Monarchy in 1918.

In 1860, the Voivodeship of Serbia and Temes Banat was abolished and most of its territory (Banat and Bačka) was incorporated into the Habsburg Kingdom of Hungary, although direct Hungarian rule began only in 1867, after the Austro-Hungarian Compromise. Unlike Banat and Bačka, in 1860 Syrmia was incorporated into the Kingdom of Slavonia, another separate Habsburg crown land. The Kingdom of Slavonia subsequently merged with the Kingdom of Croatia, forming the new kingdom of Croatia-Slavonia, which concluded an agreement with the Kingdom of Hungary in 1868, becoming an autonomous region of the Kingdom of Hungary within Austria-Hungary.

Languages
The two official languages of the Voivodeship were German and "Illyrian" (what would come to be known as Serbian).

Demographics

The Voivodeship was ethnically very mixed, since the southern parts of Syrmia, Banat and Bačka with compact Serbian settlements were not included in it, while eastern Banat, with a Romanian majority was added to it.

1846
According to the 1846 census, the territory that in 1849 formed the voivodeship included:
 Vlachs (Romanians) = 417,000
 Serbs = 402,000
 Germans = 352,000
 Hungarians = 233,000
 Slovaks = 27,000
 Bulgarians = 24,000
 Jews = 16,000
 Romani = 12,000
 Rusyns = 7,000
 Croats = 3,000
 Greeks = 3,000

1857
In 1857, population of the voivodeship numbered 1,526,105 inhabitants, including:
 Roman Catholics = 698,189 (45.75%)
 Eastern Orthodox Christians = 691,828 (45.33%)
 Evangelic-Lutherans = 56,871 (3.73%)
 Evangelic-Reformists = 29,281 (1.92%)
 Greek Catholics and Armenian Catholics = 26,244 (1.72%)
 Jews = 23,203 (1.52%)
 others = 489 (0.03%)

1850/51
According to the 1850/51 census, ethnic composition of the voivodeship was as follows:
Romanians = 347,459
Germans = 335,080
Serbs = 321,110 (*)
Hungarians = 221,845
Bunjevci and Šokci = 62,936 (*)
Rusins = 39,914
Slovaks = 25,607
Bulgarians = 22,780
Jews = 15,507
Gypsies = 11,440
Czechs = 7,530
Croats = 2,860 (*)
Greeks and Cincars = 2,820

(*) Total number of "Illyrian Slavs" (Serbs, Bunjevci, Šokci, and Croats) was 386,906.

According to another source, in 1850/1851, the population of the voivodeship numbered 1,426,221 inhabitants, including:
 397,459 (27.87%) Romanians
 335,080 (23.49%) Germans
 321,110 (22.52%) Serbs
 221,845 (15.56%) Hungarians
 others.

By religious makeup:

In 1851, population of the voivodeship numbered 1,426,221 inhabitants, including:
 Eastern Orthodox Christians = 694,029 (48.66%)
 Roman Catholics = 624,839 (43.81%)
 Evangelic-Lutherans = 51,724 (3.63%)
 Evangelic-Reformists = 26,621 (1.87%)
 Jews = 16,252 (1.14%)
 Greek Catholics and Armenian Catholics = 12,756 (0.89%)

1860
In 1860, population of the voivodeship numbered 1,525,523 inhabitants, including:
432,523 Serbs
414,490 Romanians
396,156 Germans
256,164 Hungarians

Administrative divisions
At first, Voivodeship was divided into two districts: 
Batschka-Torontal (Bačka-Torontal)
Temeschwar-Karasch (Timișoara-Caraș)

Later, it was divided into five districts:
Großbetschkerek / Veliki Bečkerek (In 1850, population of the district numbered 388,704 inhabitants, including: 126,730 Germans, 124,111 Serbs, 60,781 Hungarians, 58,292 Romanians, 11,045 Bulgarians, 3,752 Croats, 2,562 Slovaks, 1,421 Jews, etc.)
Lugosch / Lugoj (In 1850, population of the district numbered 229,363 inhabitants, including: 197,363 Romanians, 21,179 Germans, 8,305 Bulgarians, 1,505 Hungarians, 612 Serbs, etc.)
Neusatz / Novi Sad (In 1850, population of the district numbered 236,943 inhabitants, including: 100,382 Serbs, 45,936 Germans, 30,450 Hungarians, 20,683 Slovaks, 13,665 Šokci, 2,098 Jews, etc.)
Temeschwar / Timișoara (In 1850, population of the district numbered 316,565 inhabitants, including: 159,292 Romanians, 101,339 Germans, 34,263 Serbs, 12,412 Hungarians, 3,664 Bulgarians, 2,307 Šokci, 1,650 Slovaks, etc.)
Zombor / Sombor (In 1850, population of the district numbered 376,366 inhabitants, including: 160,016 Hungarians, 103,886 Germans, 53,908 Bunjevci, 40,054 Serbs, 7,830 Jews, etc.)

Administration

Great Voivodes
Francis Joseph I, (1849–1916)
Charles I, (1916–1918)

Note: the voivodeship was abolished in 1860, but Francis Joseph kept the title of "Great Voivode" until his death in 1916, and the title was also inherited by the last Emperor of Austria, Charles I.

Governors
Ferdinand Mayerhofer, (1849–1851)
Johann Coronini-Cronberg, (1851–1859)
Josip Šokčević, (1859–1860)
Karl Bigot de Saint-Quentin, (1860)

See also
 Vojvodina
 Serbian Vojvodina
 May Assembly
 History of Serbia

References

Sources

External links

 Bahovo doba - Vojvodstvo Srbija i Tamiški Banat (in Serbian)

 

 
Vojvodina under Habsburg rule
19th century in Romania
19th century in Serbia
History of Serbia
History of Banat
History of Bačka
History of Syrmia
1849 establishments in the Austrian Empire
1860 disestablishments in the Austrian Empire